Hureau de Sénarmont is a surname. Notable people with the surname include:

Alexandre-Antoine Hureau de Sénarmont (1769–1810), French general
Henri Hureau de Sénarmont (1808–1862), French mineralogist

fr:Hureau de Sénarmont